Eucalyptus dolichocera is a species of mallee that is endemic to Western Australia. It has rough, ribbony bark near the base, smooth grey to brownish above, lance-shaped adult leaves, flower buds arranged in groups of seven, yellow to cream-coloured flowers and cup-shaped or urn-shaped fruit.

Description
Flowering occurs between October and November and the flowers are yellow to cream-coloured.

Classification
Eucalyptus dolichocera was first formally described by the botanists Lawrence Alexander Sidney Johnson and Ken Hill in 1999 in the journal Telopea. The specific epithet (dolichocera) is derived from the Ancient Greek words dolichos meaning "long" and keros meaning "horn" referring to the long narrow operculum.

This species belongs to the Eucalyptus subgenus Symphyomyrtus in the section Bisectae and the subsection Destitutae. It is similar in appearance to Eucalyptus moderata.

Distribution
This mallee grows in laterite, limestone or sand on dunes, flats and sandplains and has a range from just north of Geraldton to Dowerin and Wongan Hills in the Avon Wheatbelt, Geraldton Sandplains, Mallee and Yalgoo biogeographic regions.

Conservation status
Eucalyptus dolichocera is classified as "not threatened" by the Western Australian Government Department of Parks and Wildlife

See also
List of Eucalyptus species

References

Eucalypts of Western Australia
dolichocera
Myrtales of Australia
Plants described in 1999
Taxa named by Lawrence Alexander Sidney Johnson
Taxa named by Ken Hill (botanist)